Maria Mstislavna of Kiev (died 1179), was a Grand Princess consort of Kiev by marriage to Prince Vsevolod II of Kiev. She was the daughter of Mstislav I of Kiev and Christina Ingesdotter of Sweden.

Her marriage was arranged in 1116 to facilitate better relations between her father and spouse, who were long standing enemies. During the reign of her spouse, she was known for her diplomatic ability, and often asked to mediate between her husband and brothers. She is believed to be one of the founders of St. Cyril's Monastery.

Issue
 Sviatoslav III of Kiev
 Yaroslav II Vsevolodovich, born in 1139
 Anna of Chernigov, married a prince of Halych, son of Vasylko Rostyslavych according to some chronicles
 Zvenislava of Chernigov, married Boleslaw I the Tall, Duke of Wroclaw

References

 Морозова Л. Великие и неизвестные женщины Древней Руси. — М.: АСТ, 2009

1179 deaths
12th-century Rus' women
Kievan Rus' princesses